Divide and Conquer is the fifth studio album by Greek thrash metal band Suicidal Angels, released on 10 January 2014. It is their third album for NoiseArt Records, and their second to enter the German official album charts.

The production took place at the Music Factory and Prophecy Studios in Germany, as well as Zero Gravity Studios in Athens. Some parts of the album were edited by Jörg Uken at Soundlodge Studios, based in Rhauderfehn, Germany. The album was mixed and mastering by Fredrik Nordström at the Fredman Studios in Gothenburg, Sweden.

Track listing 
All music and arrangements by Nick and Orfeas; All lyrics by Nick.

Personnel

References 

2014 albums